Kebabaluba is a 1995 Turkish animated short film  directed by Enis Tahsin Özgür. The film was an official selection of the 1995 Annecy International Animated Film Festival.

Plot 
Hamdi is a simple doner kebab salesman, but he is very proud of his job.

References

External links
 The film on Vimeo

1990s animated short films
Turkish animated films
Turkish short films
Turkish animated short films
1990s English-language films